Webb Street School is a public school in the Gaston County Schools school district and is located in Gastonia, North Carolina, United States. Webb Street serves students ages 5–22 with intellectual disabilities. The school's instructional program follows the North Carolina Standard Course of Study. In addition, students are instructed within Gaston County through the Community Based Training program. The current principal is Kelli Howe.

References

Schools in Gaston County, North Carolina
Public high schools in North Carolina
Public middle schools in North Carolina
Public elementary schools in North Carolina